Timothy Harris Jr. (born July 31, 1995) is an American football cornerback for the St. Louis BattleHawks of the XFL. He played college football at Virginia.

Professional career

San Francisco 49ers
Harris was drafted by the San Francisco 49ers in the sixth round (198th overall) of the 2019 NFL Draft. He was placed on injured reserve on August 26, 2019 with a groin injury.

On September 5, 2020, Harris was waived by the 49ers and signed to the practice squad the next day. He was placed on the practice squad/injured list on September 16, and restored to the practice squad on October 7. He was elevated to the active roster on December 7 and December 25 for the team's weeks 13 and 16 games against the Buffalo Bills and Arizona Cardinals, and reverted to the practice squad after each game. He signed a reserve/future contract on January 4, 2021. On August 4, 2021, Harris was waived/injured by the 49ers and placed on injured reserve. He was released on August 11.

Buffalo Bills
On August 24, 2021, Harris signed a one-year deal with the Buffalo Bills. He was waived on August 30, 2021.

Cleveland Browns
Harris was signed to the Cleveland Browns' practice squad on September 2, 2021. The Browns elevated Harris to their active roster on October 30, 2021; he reverted to the practice squad on November 1, 2021. Harris was released from the Browns' practice squad on November 10, 2021.

Buffalo Bills (second stint)
On November 29, 2021, Harris was signed to the Buffalo Bills practice squad. After the Bills were eliminated in the Divisional Round of the 2021 playoffs, he signed a reserve/future contract on January 24, 2022. He was released on August 16, 2022.

St. Louis BattleHawks
Harris was placed on the reserve list by the St. Louis BattleHawks of the XFL on February 20, 2023. He was activated on March 13.

References

External links
 Virginia Cavaliers bio

1995 births
Living people
American football cornerbacks
Buffalo Bills players
Players of American football from Richmond, Virginia
San Francisco 49ers players
Virginia Cavaliers football players
Cleveland Browns players
St. Louis BattleHawks players